Chatang or seasoned flour mush is a traditional gruel common to both Beijing cuisine and Tianjin cuisine, and often sold as a snack on the street. It is made from sorghum flour and/or broomcorn millet and/or proso millet flour and glutinous millet flour. The Chinese name is figurative, not literal, as there is neither any tea nor any soup in this dish.

Preparation
The dish is prepared in two steps. First, flours of sorghum and/or millet are cooked in advance, often by stir-frying. When a customer orders the dish, hot water is poured into a bowl containing the flour(s) to create a paste-like mush, which is served with white and/or brown sugar and sweet osmanthus sauce (桂花酱; pinyin: guìhuā jiàng). The sweet osmanthus plant is not native to northern China.

Traditionally, the skill of the server was judged on several factors and one of them is regarding the resulting mush: the most skillful server would be able to create the mush so thick that when a chopstick is inserted into the mush it remains vertical, while at the same time the mush remains fluid. Other criteria for the servers' skills included the ability not to splash any hot water outside the bowl and spill out any flour, because traditionally all ingredients are placed in a bowl into which is poured boiling water from a special copper kettle with a long, dragon-shaped spout called 龙嘴大铜壶 (pinyin: lóngzuǐ dàtónghú; literally "dragon mouth large copper kettle"), and special skills were needed to handle this equipment.  The ingredients are then stirred together and the chatang is eaten with a spoon.

Kettle
Traditionally, chatang vendors were easily distinguished by the kettle they used. The kettle was extremely large, up to four feet tall with a diameter in excess of a foot, and was often made of copper. There are two kinds of kettles: those used by street vendors, and those found in restaurants and tea houses. The two differ in internal structure.

The kettles used by street vendors are double-layered, with fuel in the inner layer in the center and water in the outside layer, similar to samovars. The advantage of such a structure is that it reduces the need to carry a stove to heat the water in the kettle, and it improves fuel efficiency since most heat is utilized, in contrast to the use of a separate kettle and stove. Furthermore, in the windy weather conditions of northern China, such a structure prevents the flame from being blown out by the wind.

Despite the two varieties of kettles' identical external appearance, the complex structure of the kettles used by street vendors is not present for those used in restaurants and tea houses, for obvious reasons: since the stove is located inside, it is immune to the windy weather outside and stoves are necessary to cook other dishes, so there is no need to pay extra for a more expensive kettle with such a complex structure.

Cultural representations
The different ways of serving seasoned flour mush have some cultural significance in distinguishing that of Beijing cuisine from Tianjin cuisine, since the same kind of seasoned flour mush tastes identical. Traditionally, the styles of serving were clearly different when the hot water is poured from the kettle:

The way hot water was poured in Beijing cuisine was that the server stood straight up, with legs apart at distance greater than the width of his shoulder, while the upper body leaned toward the bowl.  In contrast, the way hot water was poured in Tianjin cuisine was that the server was in a semi-squatting down position with body straight. Obviously, such a feat is rather dangerous, especially without any specialized training, and thus the special kettle has been phased out as modern technology enables the dish to be served like coffee, and the use of a kettle only survives in extremely rare occasions as a cultural heritage demonstration.

Seasoned millet mush

Seasoned millet mush (in Chinese, simplified: 面茶, traditional: 麵茶, pinyin: miànchá, literally "flour tea") in northern China is a savoury flour gruel. It is made using only millet flour rather than a combination of sorghum and millet flour. Rather than sweet osmanthus sauce and sugar, it is seasoned with sesame paste, ground Sichuan peppercorns, and salt.

In Fujian and Taiwan, where it is known as mee teh in Southern Min, the mush is a sweet snack made with wheat flour and seasoned with sugar and sesame seeds.

Seasoned oily flour mush
Seasoned oily flour mush (in Chinese, 油茶, pinyin: yóuchá, literally, "oil tea") is a variety of seasoned flour mush made by stir-frying, or sometimes pan-frying, the flour with animal fat, typically beef fat. Beef bone marrow may also be added. After frying, it is served in the same manner as seasoned flour mush.

See also
Tsampa
List of porridges

References

External links
Article about chatang

Beijing cuisine
Tianjin cuisine
Porridges
Millets